Sheoganj is a town in Sirohi District of Rajasthan state in India located on the bank of Jawai River. Sheoganj is the tehsil headquarters of Sheoganj Tehsil by the same name.

Sheoganj is famous for its cloth, jewellery and sweets market in nearby regions of the town. And sheoganj has a great laundry shop name - kalpana dry clean and roll presh shop , dhan Mandi, sheoganj.New Nasta Gali, Dhan Mandi, Sheoganj, Rajasthan 307027 

Nearby is the Erinpura Chhavani, which was the military base station of the British soldiers. The nearest railway station is Jawai Bandh. Jawai River separates Sumerpur and Sheoganj. Falna is within one hour, while Ranakpur is within two-hour drive from here. Even Bamnera which is just 12 km. from Sheoganj is also very close for visiting ancient temples.
The district is known for its enormous pomegranate, papaya, lemon, guava and grapefruit plantations.

Geography
It has an average elevation of 260 metres (853 feet).

Demographics
 Indian census, Sheoganj had a population of 24,780. Males constitute 83% of the population and females 17%. Sheoganj has an average literacy rate of 67%, higher than the national average of 59.5%: male literacy is 77%, and female literacy is 56%. In Sheoganj, 16% of the population is under 6 years of age.

References

External links
 Culture page on Official website of the Sirohi district
 http://sheoganjcity.com/City_pictures.html

Cities and towns in Sirohi district